Hotel Metropol or Hotel Metropole may refer to:

United Kingdom
 Hotel Metropole, Leeds
 Hilton Birmingham Metropole, the largest hotel in England outside London
 Hilton Brighton Metropole, a 4-star hotel and conference centre located on the seafront in Brighton, East Sussex
 Metropole Hotel, London

United States 
 Hotel Metropole (New York City), the first hotel in New York City that had running water in every room
 Hotel Metropole (Cincinnati, Ohio)
 Hotel Metropole (Santa Cruz, California), built in 1908, added to the National Register of Historical Places in 1979, demolished after being severely damaged in the 1989 Loma Prieta earthquake

Other places
 Hotel Metropole, Brussels, built in 1895, the only 19th-century hotel in Brussels still in operation today
 Hotel Metropole, Dublin, a former landmark closed in 1972
 Hotel Métropole Geneva, a hotel in Geneva, Switzerland, opened in 1854.
 Hotel Metropole, Monte Carlo, built in 1886
 Hotel Metropole, Vienna, a hotel in Vienna, Austria that was constructed in 1871–73 but destroyed during World War II after serving as the headquarters of the Gestapo from 1938, with the address Morzinplatz, in the I. District Innere Stadt
 Hotel Metropole, Ipswich, a heritage-listed hotel in Queensland, Australia
 Hotel Metropol (Moscow)
 Metropol Palace Hotel Belgrade, formerly known as Hotel Metropol, one of Belgrade's architectural monuments, opened in 1957 on Bulevar Kralja Aleksandra, the longest street in the urban part of the city, designed by Serbian architect Dragiša Brašovan
 Sofitel Legend Metropole Hanoi, a 5-star historic luxury hotel opened in 1901 in the French colonial style
 Theatre Royal and Metropole Hotel, former theatre and hotel in Perth, Western Australia

See also
 Metropol (disambiguation)